Bazaarvoice is a technology company based in Austin, Texas, that provides software that allows brands and retailers to collect and display several types of user-generated content (UGC) on their e-commerce websites. Bazaarvoice's services include product ratings and reviews, questions and answers, sampling, visual and social content, insights, social commerce and social publishing.

History

Bazaarvoice was cofounded in 2005 by Brett Hurt and Brant Barton in Austin, Texas. Currently, the company also has offices in New York City, Chicago, London, Munich, Belfast, Paris, Vilnius, Sydney, and Bengaluru. The company has over 900 employees globally.

Initially, Bazaarvoice focused on software that let businesses add product reviews to their websites. Bazaarvoice later expanded to include software that allows businesses to analyze reviews, ratings, videos, social media, and other user-generated content posted by customers, which is used by companies including Wal-Mart, AT&T and Microsoft.

The company went public on the NASDAQ in 2012, raising $114 million in its initial public offering. Following that, in a 2013 Gartner report, Bazaarvoice was named one of the ten fastest growing CRM vendors. A year later in 2014, Bazaarvoice and TripleLift partnered to allow native ads to run on client websites.

In 2018, the company was taken private after being purchased by Marlin Equity Partners. In 2021, Bazaarvoice announced a majority investment from Thomas H. Lee Partners.

Over the years, the company has made a variety of acquisitions, including AddStructure, a natural language processing platform, in 2018; Influenster, a product discovery and reviews platform, in 2019; and Curalate, a social commerce platform, in 2020.

Keith Nealon was named CEO in January 2020, replacing interim CEO Joe Davis.

References 

Marketing companies of the United States
Marketing companies established in 2005
Companies based in Austin, Texas
Software companies of the United States
Software companies established in 2005
E-commerce software
Customer relationship management software companies